Chocolate-covered prunes, also known as plums in chocolate or prunes in chocolate, are a kind of sweet; a chocolate candy with an entire dried plum as a filling.

A  chocolate-covered prune or plum is a typical Polish delicacy. Along with similarly prepared dried apricots, chocolate-covered prunes are a traditional confectionery in Russia and Ukraine.

Variations
Chocolate-covered or chocolate cream covered cooked plums are also prepared. Toasted almonds or walnuts can be included at the center of the confection. Crushed nuts can be used as a topping.

See also

 Chocolate-covered cherry
 Chocolate-covered raisins
 Chocolate-covered fruit
 List of chocolate-covered foods
 List of plum dishes

References

Chocolate-covered foods
Polish cuisine
Russian desserts
Ukrainian desserts
Plum dishes